Konstantin Vasilyevich Gerchik (September 27, 1918 – June 24, 2001) was a Soviet military leader, Colonel-General of the Soviet Army, Professor of the Academy of Military Sciences of Russia, a veteran of the Great Patriotic War, and the second head of the Baikonur Cosmodrome (1958–1961).

Biography 
Gerchik was born on 27 September 1918 and in the village of Soroki (Slutsky Uyezd, Minsk). He was in the Red Army from 1938, then enrolled in the 2nd Leningrad Artillery School, graduating in 1940.

He took part in the battles of the Great Patriotic War from the first days. After the victory Gerchik entered the Artillery Academy named after F. E. Dzerzhinsky, graduated from it, then taught General tactics and tactics of artillery in this school. 

In 1957, Gerchik was appointed chief of staff of the Baikonur cosmodrome. On 2 July 1958 he became the head of the cosmodrome. On 8 May 1960 he was promoted to Major general.

Accident at the cosmodrome 

On October 24 1960 in the time of the accident at the 41 site of the spaceport, Gerchik together with his Deputy, Alexander Mrykhin, a Lieutenant general subsequently a Hero of Socialist Labour was in the vicinity of the outbreak missiles R-16.

During the disaster, Chief marshal of the branch M. I. Nedelin and about 70 people were killed. Gerchik was saved from death by the body of the rocket, which blocked the flame from the working engines of the second stage to burn out the immediate vicinity of the rocket. Still Konstantin Vasilyevich got severe burns when he ran away from the burning rocket. After the incident, General Gerchik was in critical conditions, but survived, then for a long time he was treated in hospitals.

Further biography 

After cure in 1961 K. V. Gerchik became the chief of the formed Central Command Post of Strategic Missile Forces (RVSN), at the same time he became the Deputy chief of the General staff RVSN for combat management. In 1963 he became the chief of staff of a missile army. In 1968, Gerchik was awarded the rank of [Lieutenant General] and in the same year he graduated from the Higher academic courses at Military Academy of the General staff.

Since 1972 he was the commander of the Smolensk missile army. In 1976 was promoted to the rank of Colonel general.

In 1979 he retired from the military. He worked in several scientific institutes, including the institutions of the USSR Academy of Sciences. 

Since 1991 he is the Chairman of the Interregional Council of Baikonur Cosmodrome veterans.

In 1996, for his great personal contribution to the development of Russian cosmonautics K. V. Gerchik received official thanks from the President of Russian Federation .

He died on 24 June 2001 in Moscow and was buried at Troyekurovskoye Cemetery.

Honours and awards
Soviet Union

Foreign

Publications 
 "A breakthrough in space" – Konstantin Vasilyevich Gerchik, M: LLC "Veles", 1994. 
 K. V. Gerchik is the author of the article "the Triumph of Russian science and technology", which was referred to and is still referred to by the authors of works on cosmonautics.

Literature 
 "Rockets and people" – B. E. Chertok, M: "mechanical engineering", 1999.  
 "The hidden space" – Nikolai Kamanin, М: "Инфортекс-ИФ, 1995.
 "Korolev: Facts and myths" – J. K. Golovanov, M: Nauka, 1994. 
 "People duty and honor" – A. A. Shmelev, "libris", 1996. 
 "People duty and honor" – A. A. Shmelev, the second book. M: Editorial Board "Moscow journal", 1998.
 "Testing of rocket and space technology – the business of my life" Events and facts – A.I. Ostashev, Korolyov, 2001.
 "Unknown Baikonur" – edited by B. I. Posysaeva, M.: "globe", 2001. 
 "Top secret General" – E.T. Beloglazova, M: "the Heroes of the Fatherland", 2005. 
 "Melua, A.I." " Rocket technology, cosmonautics and artillery. Biographies of scientists and specialists.- 2nd ed., supplement, St. Petersburg: "Humanistics", 2005. С. 355. ISBN 5-86050-243-5 
 "Rocket and space feat Baikonur" – Vladimir Порошков, the "Patriot" publishers 2007. 
 A.I. Ostashev, Sergey Pavlovich Korolyov – The Genius of the 20th Century — 2010 M. of Public Educational Institution of Higher Professional Training MGUL .
 "Bank of the Universe" – edited by Boltenko A. C., Kiev, 2014., publishing house "Phoenix", 
 "To stand on the way to space" – Author: Valentin Lebedev, M: publisher ITRK in 2016, 
 "We grew hearts in Baikonur" – Author: Eliseev V. I. M: publisher OAO MPK in 2018, 
 "I look back and have no regrets. " - Author: Abramov, Anatoly Petrovich: publisher "New format" Barnaul, 2022.

References

1918 births
2001 deaths
Communist Party of the Soviet Union members
Military Academy of the General Staff of the Armed Forces of the Soviet Union alumni
Recipients of the Medal of Zhukov
Recipients of the Order of Courage
Recipients of the Order of Kutuzov, 3rd class
Recipients of the Order of Lenin
Recipients of the Order of the Red Banner
Recipients of the Order of the Red Banner of Labour
Recipients of the Order of the Red Star
Soviet colonel generals
Soviet military personnel of World War II
Soviet space program personnel
Burials in Troyekurovskoye Cemetery